Alafia zambesiaca is a plant in the family Apocynaceae.

Description
Alafia zambesiaca grows as a climbing shrub or liana. Its fragrant flowers feature a creamy-white or yellowish corolla.

Distribution and habitat
Alafia zambesiaca is native to the Democratic Republic of the Congo, Tanzania, Zambia and Zimbabwe. Its habitat is savanna woodland.

References

zambesiaca
Plants described in 1981
Flora of the Democratic Republic of the Congo
Flora of Tanzania
Flora of Zambia
Flora of Zimbabwe